Burwood railway station may refer to:
Burwood North railway station, proposed Sydney Metro West station
Burwood railway station, Sydney, on the Sydney Trains network
Burwood railway station, Melbourne

See also
 Burswood railway station, Perth